Sydney Wallwork (17 August 1882 – 27 September 1966) was a British figure skater. He competed in the pairs event at the 1920 Summer Olympics.

References

1882 births
1966 deaths
British male pair skaters
Olympic figure skaters of Great Britain
Figure skaters at the 1920 Summer Olympics
Sportspeople from Manchester